The Yowie is a creature from Australian folklore.

Yowie may also refer to:

Yowie (band), experimental math rock trio from St. Louis, Missouri
Yowie (chocolate), confectionery from the Cadbury-Schweppes company

See also
Yowie Bay, New South Wales, a suburb of Sydney, Australia
Yaoi, a form of slash fiction